John Paul Kovatch (June 6, 1912 – October 11, 2013) was a professional American football player who played six games as an end for the Cleveland Rams of the National Football League (NFL) during their 1938 season. His tenure with the Rams ended in October 1938, when he fractured his backbone and was injured for the remainder of the season.

Kovatch was born in South Bend, Indiana and took up football at Central High School. Prior to his professional career he was an end on the Northwestern Wildcats football team from 1935 through 1937. After his professional career he took up football coaching at Saginaw High School in Michigan. He then served as grid coach at Illinois Wesleyan University, before becoming head football and basketball coach in January 1942, in addition to positions that he already held as athletic director and track coach. In April 1942, however, he joined Indiana University Bloomington as an assistant coach. In April 1944 he was called to serve in the United States Army during World War II.

Kovatch stayed at Indiana until March 1947, when he joined the coaching staff of his alma mater, Northwestern University. He remained there until February 1955 and was hired as an end coach at the University of Nebraska the following month. Less than a year later, in January 1956, he joined the staff at the University of Kansas. Until his death in October 2013, he was the second-oldest living former NFL player, behind Ace Parker.

References

1912 births
2013 deaths
American centenarians
Men centenarians
American football ends
Cleveland Rams players
Indiana Hoosiers football coaches
Kansas Jayhawks football coaches
Nebraska Cornhuskers football coaches
Northwestern Wildcats football coaches
Northwestern Wildcats football players
High school football coaches in Michigan
United States Army personnel of World War II
Players of American football from South Bend, Indiana